Cania Dam is a dam in central Queensland, Australia,  north west of Monto, in the locality of Cania. The dam is situated on Three Moon Creek, a tributary of the Burnett River. The dam wall is an earth and rock-fill embankment type. The dam is named after the abandoned gold mining town of Cania, which was inundated by the lake as it filled.

The dam is stocked with Australian Bass, Golden Perch, Silver Perch, and Saratoga under the Stocked Impoundment Permit Scheme.

The dam was completed in 1982, and after reaching a low of 3.31% in February 2003, it overflowed for the first time in late December 2010. The dam overflowed again in 2012, 2013 (reaching its highest recorded level of 133.32% capacity), 2015, and 2017.

Fishing

A Stocked Impoundment Permit is required to fish in the dam.

References

External links
 Cania Dam Fishing Information, Map & pictures

Reservoirs in Queensland
Wide Bay–Burnett
Dams in Queensland